Calum Giles (born 27 October 1972) in Portsmouth, England) is a former Great Britain Olympic field hockey player, who competed in the British squad at the 1996 Summer Olympics in Atlanta, and the 2000 Summer Olympics in Sydney. He went on to play another two years of international hockey before deciding to retire at the end of the 2000 Summer Olympics in Sydney.

Hockey career 
Giles started his hockey career at the age of 5 playing for OPCS in Portsmouth. He made his national league debut at the age of 18 playing for Havant Hockey Club in 1991 and his International debut at the age of 23 playing for England in 1995. He has played club hockey in England, the Netherlands as well as Bloemfontein, South Africa and Sydney Australia. 
Giles retired from International hockey in 2000 to pursue his coaching career and became a full-time player-coach to Oxted. After several years he gained the club promotion to the National League for the first time in their history. Following his time at Oxted he re-joined his childhood club Havant as player-coach where he in two years he managed to take them back to the pinnacle of English hockey for the 2007/2008 season, managing to end the season 4th in the Men's Premier Division. 
Following one season at Plymouth Marjon he became Director of hockey at Teddington Hockey Club, promoting the men's first team back to National league status in his first season.

In 2014, he took on the role of Professional Hockey Coach at Eltham College. He is now head of hockey at the school and runs his highly successful Stickwise hockey camps there.

In the summer of 2015, Giles was appointed Head Coach of Blackheath & Old Elthamians Hockey Club. In his first season, he successfully led this team to promotion to the South Premier League and to the final of the England Hockey Trophy. Blackheath & Old Elthamians won the trophy the following season.

Giles collected 143 caps for England and Great Britain and has scored 110 international goals. He retired from international hockey in 2000 and was England and Great Britain highest goalscorer for over 14 years.

He also runs the Stickwise hockey camps in school holidays as well as hockey academies.

International achievements 
1995 – European Cup, Dublin* 
1995 – Champions Trophy, Berlin
1996 – Olympic Qualifier, Barcelona
1996 – Olympic Games, Atlanta
1998 – World Cup, Utrecht
1999 – Champions Trophy, Brisbane
1999 – European Cup, Padova
2000 – Olympic Qualifier, Osaka
2000 – Champions Trophy, Amsterdam
2000 – Olympic Games, Sydney

*At the 1995 European Cup Giles became the first English player to win a top goal scorer award in a major competition

He now works at Eltham College in Mottingham, England.

References

External links
 
 Stickwise

Living people
Sportspeople from Portsmouth
English male field hockey players
Olympic field hockey players of Great Britain
British male field hockey players
Field hockey players at the 1996 Summer Olympics
1998 Men's Hockey World Cup players
Field hockey players at the 2000 Summer Olympics
1972 births
Havant Hockey Club players